is a 1997 Japanese Pink film directed by Yukio Kitazawa. It was chosen as Best Film of the year at the Pink Grand Prix ceremony.

Synopsis
A gay pink film about two detectives who investigate a gang rape after a video is sent to their office.

Critical reception
The pink film community chose I Thought About You as the Best Film of the year at the Pink Grand Prix—the first, and, as of 2009, only gay pink film to be so awarded.

Anglophone pink film authority Jasper Sharp judges that the violence in I Thought About You—particularly the video of the gang rape which the detectives receive—will be difficult viewing for most audiences, gay or straight. As one of the gay ENK studio's most highly regarded films, Sharp notes that I Thought About You sheds light on the violence against women often portrayed, and often criticized in "straight" pink films. Sharp writes, "If these films had laid themselves open to criticism for the often rough treatment the female characters received at the hands of men, the violence contained within them seems relatively restrained compared to gay porno's images of man-on-man brutality, rough sado-masochistic lovemaking and frequent scenes of violent sexual assault."

Cast
 Yōta Kawase
 Osamu Shimokawa
 Kyōsuke Sasaki
 Hajime Mao
 Hotaru Hazuki

Bibliography

English

Japanese

References

1997 films
1990s Japanese-language films
Pink films
1990s Japanese films